There are two species of lizard named Brazilian fathead anole:

 Enyalius boulengeri, native to Brazil
 Enyalius brasiliensis, native to Brazil and Uruguay

Reptile common names